Waman Gopal Joshi (18 March 1881 – 3 June 1956) (popularly known as Veer Wamanrao Joshi), was a Marathi journalist, playwright, and freedom fighter, from Amravati Maharashtra, India.  He was the editor of Rashtramat and Swatantra Hindustan during the freedom struggle of India.  He courted arrest and came to be known as Veer Wamanrao Joshi or Veer Vamanrao Joshi. He wrote the play 'RaNa-dundubhi', whose songs were made famous by Dinanath Mangeshkar.

Waman Gopal Joshi should not be confused with the writer Vaman Malhar Joshi. They were contemporaries.

He was also involved in Satyagraha and kayde bhang movement in Hyderabad free movement.

Literary work
 Rakshasi Mahattvakanksha (1914)
 Ranadundubhi (1927)

Notes

Indian independence activists from Maharashtra
Marathi-language writers
1881 births
1956 deaths
Marathi people